Naji Jaber, was a Syrian actor who was foremost identified with the character Abu Antar.

Career
Following his older brother Mahmoud, Naji Jaber pursued a career in acting by 1967 and became a member of the Syrian Actors' Syndicate in 1972.  The greatest turn in his career came the same year with the popular sitcom Wake Up Time (صح النوم) where he was cast for the stereotypical Damascus thug character named Abu Antar. The character contrasted with the light-hearted protagonist Ghawar al-Toshi (Duraid Lahham) and Abu Antar soon became one of the most popular characters in the show (along with Husni al-Borazan played by  Nehad Kaleai). He played the same character in following Ghawar series on TV and also in the motion picture Ghawar Empire (امبراطورية غوار) released in 1982. Jaber's character became so popular that "Abu Antar is a symbol of strength and humor throughout the Arab World".  Nevertheless, one of his exceptional but prominent roles was in Dreams of the City in 1984.

and share  for Shaytan Al Jazzirah (1978), Sah Al-Nawm (1975) and Amoot marratayn wa uhibbuk (1976).

Family
Jaber came from a Druze family of actors and actresses that includes Mahmoud and Haitham Jaber (brothers), Leila and Marah Jaber (nieces) and Dana Jaber (grandniece).

Death
Jaber died from cancer on 30 March 2009 at 69 years of age. His brother, Mahmoud Jaber, also died of cancer in July 2008 at 73 years of age.

References

External links
Naji Jaber at ElCinema

Syrian people of Druze descent
Syrian male television actors
Syrian Druze
1940 births
2009 deaths
People from as-Suwayda Governorate
Deaths from cancer in Syria